Pekhtach is a rural locality (a village) in Beketovskoye Rural Settlement, Vozhegodsky District, Vologda Oblast, Russia. The population was 16 as of 2002.

Geography 
Pekhtach is located 65 km west of Vozhega (the district's administrative centre) by road. Kozlovo is the nearest rural locality.

References 

Rural localities in Vozhegodsky District